Yi Je-hyeon (Hangul: 이제현, Hanja: 李齊賢; 28 January 1288 – 24 August 1367) of the Gyeongju Yi clan, was a Goryeo politician, Neo-Confucianism scholar, philosopher, writer and poet. He was the follower and successor of Baek Yijeong, and the father of Royal Consort Hye-bi, who would eventually become the consort of King Gongmin.

Family
 Great-Great-Grandfather
 Yi Seung-go (이승고, 李升高)
 Great-Grandfather
 Yi Deuk-gyeon (이득견, 李得堅)
 Grandfather
 Yi Haek (이핵, 李翮)
Grandmother
Lady Kim of the Gimhae Kim clan (김해 김씨)
Father
Yi Jin (이진, 李瑱) (1244 – 1321)
 Uncle - Yi In-jeong (이인정, 李仁挺)
 Uncle - Yi Se-gi (이세기, 李世基)
Mother
 Grand Lady Park of the Jinhan State (진한국대부인)
 Grandfather - Park In-yuk (박인육, 朴仁育)
 Siblings
Older brother - Yi Gwan (이관, 李琯)
Younger brother - Yi Ji-jeong (이지정, 李之正)
Wives and their issue(s):
Lady Gwon of Gilchang State (길창국부인 권씨) (1288 - 1332); daughter of Gwon Bu (권부, 權溥)
 Son - Yi Seo-jong (이서종, 李瑞種)
 Daughter-in-law - Lady Hong (홍씨, 洪氏); daughter of Hong Yu (홍유, 洪侑)
 Grandson - Yi Bo-rim (이보림)
 Son - Yi Dal-jon (이달존, 李達尊) (1313 - 24 July 1340)
 Daughter-in-law - Lady Baek, daughter of Baek Yi-jeong (백이정) from the Nampo Baek clan (남포 백씨)
 Grandson - Yi Deok-rim (이덕림, 李德林)
 Great-Grandson - Yi Shin (이신, 李伸)
 Grandson - Yi Hak-rim (이학림, 李學林)
 Great-Grandson - Yi Dam (이담, 李擔)
 Great-Granddaughter - Lady Yi of the Gyeongju Yi clan (경주 이씨, 慶州 李氏)
 Great Grandson-in-law - Ki In-geol (기인걸, 奇仁傑) of the Haengju Ki clan
 Great-Granddaughter - Lady Yi of the Gyeongju Yi clan (경주 이씨, 慶州 李氏)
 Great-Granddaughter - Lady Yi of the Gyeongju Yi clan (경주 이씨, 慶州 李氏)
 Grandson - Yi Su-rim (이수림, 李壽林) (? - 1369)
 Granddaughter - Lady Yi of the Gyeongju Yi clan (경주 이씨, 慶州 李氏)
 Granddaughter - Lady Yi of the Gyeongju Yi clan (경주 이씨, 慶州 李氏)
 Granddaughter - Lady Yi of the Gyeongju Yi clan (경주 이씨, 慶州 李氏)
 Unnamed son; died young
 Daughter - Lady Yi of the Gyeongju Yi clan (경주 이씨, 慶州 李氏)
 Son-in-law - Im Deok-su (임덕수, 任德壽/任德秀)
 Daughter - Lady Yi of the Gyeongju Yi clan (경주 이씨, 慶州 李氏)
 Son-in-law - Yi Gye-son (이계손, 李係孫) of the Yeonan Yi clan
 Daughter - Princess Uihwa, Lady Yi of the Gyeongju Yi clan (의화택주 경주 이씨, 義和宅主 慶州 李氏)
 Son-in-law - Kim Hui-jo (김희조, 金希祖)
 Daughter - Lady Yi of the Gyeongju Yi clan (경주 이씨, 慶州 李氏); died young 
 Lady Suchun of the Park clan (수춘국부인 박씨, 壽春國夫人 朴氏); daughter of Park Geo-sil (박거실, 朴居實)
 Son - Yi Chang-ro (이창로, 李彰路)
 Daughter - Royal Consort Hye-bi of the Gyeongju Yi clan (혜비 이씨) (? - 29 February 1408)
 Son-in-law - Wang Jeon, King Gongmin of Goryeo (고려 공민왕) (23 May 1330 - 27 October 1374)
 Daughter - Lady Yi of the Gyeongju Yi clan (경주 이씨, 慶州 李氏)
 Son-in-law - Park Dong-saeng (박동생, 朴東生)
 Daughter - Lady Yi of the Gyeongju Yi clan (경주 이씨, 慶州 李氏)
 Son-in-law - Song Mu (송무, 宋懋)
 Princess Consort Seowon of the Seo clan (서원군부인 서씨, 瑞原郡夫人 徐氏); daughter of Seo Jung-rin (서중린, 徐仲麟)
 Daughter - Lady Yi of the Gyeongju Yi clan (경주 이씨, 慶州 李氏)
 Son-in-law - Kim Nam-woo (김남우, 金南雨)
 Daughter - Lady Yi of the Gyeongju Yi clan (경주 이씨, 慶州 李氏)
 Son-in-law - Lee Yu-bang (이유방, 李有芳)
 Unnamed concubine 
 Daughter - Lady Yi of the Gyeongju Yi clan (경주 이씨, 慶州 李氏)
 Son-in-law - Im Bu-yang (임부양, 林富陽)
 Daughter - Lady Yi of the Gyeongju Yi clan (경주 이씨, 慶州 李氏)

Other

Books
《Ikjaenango, 익재난고》 : the 17 poems of Goryeo songs were translated and published in Korean, they are a valuable resource for the study of Goryeo songs today.
《Ikjaejip, 익재집》
《Yeokongpaeseol, 역옹패설》
《Hyohaengrok, 효행록》
《Guksa, 국사, 國史》: incomplete relic
《Ungeumrugi, 운금루기》

Arts

Gimadogangdo

Legacy
《Portrait of Yi Jehyeon, 이제현 초상》 – National Treasure No. 110 and Chungcheongbuk-do Cultural Heritage No. 72
《Gangjingugoksasojangikjaeyijehyeonsanggwabaeksayihangboksang, 강진구곡사소장익재이제현상과백사이항복상》– Jeollanam-do Cultural Heritage No. 189
《Gasansasojangikjaeyeongjeong, 가산사소장익재영정》– Jeollanam-do Cultural Heritage No. 164
《Ikjaeyeongjeong, 익재영정》 – Gyeongsangbuk-do Cultural Heritage No. 90

In popular culture
 Portrayed by Kim Kil-ho in the 1983 KBS TV series Foundation of the Kingdom.
 Portrayed by Song Jae-ho in the 2005–2006 MBC TV series Sin Don.
 Portrayed by Song Min-hyung in the 2012 SBS TV series Faith.

References

External links
Yi Jehyeon on Encykorea. .

1287 births
1367 deaths
People from North Gyeongsang Province
Korean politicians
Korean scholars
Korean male poets
Korean Confucianists
Neo-Confucian scholars
14th-century Korean poets
14th-century Korean painters
14th-century Korean philosophers